Christmas in My Heart is the first Christmas album and the fifth studio album by German recording artist Sarah Connor. Connor worked with frequent collaborators Rob Tyger and Kay Denar on the album.

Chart performance
Christmas in My Heart peaked at number six on the Austrian, German, and Swiss Albums Chart.

In 2006 after a baby break Sarah decided to reissue "Christmas in my heart" with a new lead single "Best side of life".  "The Best side of life" was featured in Coca-Cola's German Christmas promotional campaign.  The single reached #4 on the German charts.  The reissue didn't fare as well, however, debuting at #49 on the German charts, peaking at #25.  On the same date Sarah also released a concert DVD of her performing the Christmas tunes under the same name as the album.

Track listing
All songs produced by Rob Tyger and Kay D.

Notes 
"Be Thankful" is an English language interpretation of "Vom Himmel hoch, da komm ich her".
"Sweet Is the Song" is an English language interpretation of "Süßer die Glocken nie klingen".
"Why Does It Rain" is an English language interpretation of "Schneeflöckchen, Weißröckchen".
"Tonight's the Night" is an English language interpretation of "O du fröhliche".
"A New Kingdom" is an English language interpretation of "Leise rieselt der Schnee".
"Come Together" is an English language interpretation of "Morgen, Kinder wird's was geben".

Charts

Certifications and sales

Release history

References

External links
 

Sarah Connor (singer) albums
Christmas albums by German artists
2005 Christmas albums
Pop Christmas albums
Contemporary R&B Christmas albums